Dennis Michael Alldredge (April 13, 1941 – December 19, 1997) was an American film and television actor. He played Frank Foley in the short-lived drama television series Almost Grown. He also played Bill Graham in the miniseries V and Tony Montana's lawyer George Sheffield in the 1983 film Scarface.

Alldredge guest-starred in numerous television programs, including ER, The Bob Newhart Show, Quantum Leap, One Day at a Time, Three's Company, Who's the Boss? and All in the Family. He also appeared on two segments of the 1985 anthology television series The Twilight Zone. Alldredge died in December 1997 at Los Angeles, California, at the age of 56.

Filmography

Film

Television

References

External links 

Rotten Tomatoes profile

1941 births
1997 deaths
20th-century American male actors
People from Bakersfield, California
Male actors from California
American male film actors
American male television actors